Tsogto Garmayevich Badmazhapov (1879-1937) was a Russian translator, Mongolist, and discoverer of the city of Khara-Khoto.

Biography 
An ethnic Buryat, he was a native of Troitskosavsk in the Zabaykalskoy Oblast of the Russian Empire from the Cossack estate of Kyakhta. In his capacity as a translator and explorer with the rank of senior warden (uryadnik) he participated in the Mongolo-Kamskoy Expedition of Pyotr Kozlov (1899-1901). He worked for a trading company based at Kyakhta, "Sobennikov and Molchanov Brothers" under Bazar Baradin. 
He was executed in 1937 on charges of participating in a counter-revolutionary conspiracy against the Mongolian People's Republic.

Badmazhanov's home in Urga is now the Historical Museum of Ulan-Bator.

References 

 Цокто Бадмажапов — первооткрыватель "Мертвого города «Хара-Хото». (Tsokto Badmazhapov: Discoverer of the "Lost City" of Khara-Khoto). 
 Персоналии — Наука и образование — Бадмажапов Ц. Г. (People: Academia & Education: Badmazhapov, Ts.G.
 Люди и Судьбы (People and Events)

1879 births
1937 deaths
Mongolists
Mongolian People's Republic
People executed by the Soviet Union
Buryat people
Explorers from the Russian Empire